52246 Donaldjohanson, provisional designation , is a carbonaceous Erigonian asteroid from the inner regions of the asteroid belt, approximately  in diameter. It was discovered on 2 March 1981, by American astronomer Schelte Bus at the Siding Spring Observatory in Australia. The C-type asteroid is a target of the Lucy mission and was aptly named after American paleoanthropologist Donald Johanson.

Orbit and classification 

Donaldjohanson is a member of the Erigone family, a large carbonaceous asteroid family of nearly 2,000 known members, which is named after its parent body 163 Erigone. It is a relatively old family that was created approximately 130 million years ago.

It orbits the Sun in the inner asteroid belt at a distance of 1.9–2.8 AU once every 3 years and 8 months (1,345 days; semi-major axis of 2.38 AU). Its orbit has an eccentricity of 0.19 and an inclination of 4° with respect to the ecliptic. A first precovery was taken at the discovering observatory in February 1981, extending the body's observation arc by 2 weeks prior to its official discovery observation.

Lucy mission target 
Donaldjohanson is planned to be visited by the Lucy spacecraft that was launched on 16 October 2021.

Physical characteristics 
Donaldjohanson has been characterized as a carbonaceous C-type asteroid, in-line with the C and X overall spectral type for Erigonian asteroids. It has an absolute magnitude of 15.5.

Lightcurve
Photometric observations of Donaldjohanson in August 2020 revealed that it is a slow rotator with an exceptionally high lightcurve amplitude of 1.7 magnitude. The lightcurve suggests that Donaldjohanson must either be highly elongated in shape, or possibly a synchronous binary system. Extensive photometric observations by the two TRAPPIST telescopes from November 2020 to February 2021 determined the rotation period of Donaldjohanson to be approximately 252 hours.

Diameter and albedo
According to the survey carried out by NASA's Wide-field Infrared Survey Explorer with its subsequent NEOWISE mission, Donaldjohanson measures 3.895 kilometers in diameter and its surface has an albedo of 0.103.

Naming
This minor planet is planned to be visited by the Lucy spacecraft, which would observe it en route to its main target of several Jupiter trojans. The Lucy probe is named after the "Lucy" hominid fossil, while Donaldjohanson is named for that fossil's co-discoverer Donald Johanson (born 1943), an American paleoanthropologist. The approved naming citation was published by the Minor Planet Center on 25 December 2015.

See also
 Discovery program

References

External links
 Asteroid Lightcurve Database (LCDB), query form (info )
 Dictionary of Minor Planet Names, Google books
 Discovery Circumstances: Numbered Minor Planets (50001)-(55000) – Minor Planet Center
 
 

052246
Discoveries by Schelte J. Bus
Named minor planets
Slow rotating minor planets
052246
19810302